The San Justo tornado was a powerful F5 tornado which struck San Justo, a town in the province of Santa Fe, Argentina, on January 10, 1973. At least 63 people were reported dead and 350 were reported injured as it cut a 330 yard wide swath through the town. It was the most violent tornado ever recorded in South America, and also the entire Southern Hemisphere. This tornado was widely considered to have been an F5 on the Fujita Scale, and in 2017, it received its official F5 rating. The tornado had an economic cost of about $60,000 and was the deadliest tornado in Argentina's history.

The tornado
After a morning of intense heat, at noon huge cumulonimbus clouds were seen coming. Due to the high relative humidity content and extreme instability, around 13:00 local time, the clouds produced some isolated rainfalls. Then, at about 14:15 local time, a tornado touched down right next to the General Belgrano Railroad tracks, in an open field. According to eyewitnesses, the ground was shaking, "as if several jet planes were landing over the houses".

The tornado quickly became extremely violent, reaching F5 intensity two minutes later. The tornado tore through San Justo, wrecking multiple factories and over 500 homes, leveling some homes entirely. "Like ping pong balls”, vehicles were thrown hundreds of yards and mangled beyond recognition, and grass was reportedly ripped from the ground. A newspaper image showed a vehicle motor that was embedded into a concrete wall by the tornado. A tractor was found in a wooded area 500 meters away from the dealership where it originated. The tornado reached a maximum width of 300 meters, and abruptly dissipated 7 minutes after reaching F5 intensity.

The tornado is said to have changed color multiple times, an unusual phenomenon. The tornado began with a unique violet color, and then turned red when it devastated brick homes, picking up brick dust along its path. A trailer was buried in a 2 meter wide ditch. The tornado threw cows over 30 meters in the air and passed over a lagoon, sucking up all the water that was inside of it. The tornado destroyed a ton of wooden planks, and turned them into flying projectiles, which caused most of the fatalities.

After the tornado
The supercell that spawned the tornado continued to produce heavy rain for another hour, and then rescue efforts were started immediately afterwards. The local San Justo Hospital was turned into a morgue, with bodies waiting to be identified. Radio communications were cut, and San Justo was left without electricity for some time. The tornado left over 2000 people homeless due to the extreme house damage. Dr. Ted Fujita studied this tornado, and called it “the worst tornado ever recorded in the world outside the borders of the United States.”. This is the only recorded F5 tornado in the Southern Hemisphere.

In 2018, a group of sanjustinos made a documentary film entitled Vorágine about the experience of 3 relatives of tornado casualties. The film was directed by Fernando Molinas and produced by Imanol Sánchez.

Sources
Worldwide Tornadoes--Argentina
(2001). The Tornado: Nature's Ultimate Windstorm. Norman, OK: University of Oklahoma Press.

References 

Tornadoes of 1973
Tornado
1973 in Argentina
January 1973 events in South America
Tornadoes in Argentina